Thamballapalle Assembly constituency is a constituency of Andhra Pradesh Legislative Assembly, India. It is one of 6 constituencies in Annamayya district.

Peddireddy Dwarakanatha Reddy of YSR Congress Party is currently representing the constituency.

Mandals
Thamballapalle Assembly constituency consists of six Mandals.

Members of Legislative Assembly

Assembly Elections 2019

See also
 List of constituencies of Andhra Pradesh Vidhan Sabha

References

Assembly constituencies of Andhra Pradesh